Bangabandhu Academy for Poverty Alleviation and Rural Development (বঙ্গবন্ধু দারিদ্র্য বিমোচন ও পল্লী উন্নয়ন একাডেমি) is a government academy and research institute that is responsible for decreasing poverty in rural areas of Bangladesh and is located in Dhaka, Bangladesh.

History
Bangabandhu Academy for Poverty Alleviation and Rural Development was established on 16 November 2011 by Prime Minister Sheikh Hasina. It is an autonoumous body under Rural Development and Cooperative Division of the Ministry of Local Government, Rural Development and Co-operatives. It was created after the passage of Bangabandhu Poverty Alleviation and Rural Development Academy Act 2011. The BRDB Training Academy was incorporated into the Bangabandhu Academy for Poverty Alleviation and Rural Development by the government of Bangladesh.

References

Research institutes in Bangladesh
2011 establishments in Bangladesh
Organisations based in Dhaka